Fire in the Sky is a 1993 film that dramatizes the alleged UFO abduction of Travis Walton in 1975.

Fire in the Sky may also refer to:

Music
 Fire in the Sky (album), a 1992 album by Half Japanese
  "Fire in the Sky" (filk song), both an album and title song by Jordin Kare
 "Fire in the Sky" (song), a 1986 single by American country music group Nitty Gritty Dirt Band
 "Fire in the Sky", a song by Coldrain, from the 2015 album Vena
 "Fire in the Sky", a song by Darkest Hour, from the 2007 album Deliver Us
 "Fire in the Sky", a song by Hypocrisy, from the 2000 album Into the Abyss
 "Fire in the Sky", a song by Jukebox the Ghost, from the 2008 album Let Live and Let Ghosts
 "Fire in the Sky", a song by John Butler Trio, from the 2007 album Grand National
 "Fire in the Sky", a song by Ozzy Osbourne, from the 1988 album No Rest for the Wicked
 "Fire in the Sky", a song by Anderson .Paak, from the 2021 album Shang-Chi and the Legend of the Ten Rings: The Album

Other uses
 A Fire in the Sky, a 1978 television film
 "Fire in the Sky" (Transformers episode), an episode of The Transformers
 "Fire in the Sky", a 2002 episode of the television series Relic Hunter
 Meteors: Fire in the Sky, a 2005 History Channel documentary on meteor impacts narrated by David Ackroyd
 Fire in the Sky (Seekers), the fifth novel in the Seekers series

See also
 Fire from the Sky, a 2012 album by Shadows Fall